The men's 110 metres hurdles event at the 2020 Summer Olympics took place between 3 and 5 August 2021 at the Olympic Stadium. Approximately forty athletes were expected to compete; the exact number was dependent on how many nations used universality places to enter athletes in addition to the 40 qualifying through time or ranking (1 universality place was used in 2016). 40 athletes from 29 nations competed. Hansle Parchment of Jamaica won the gold medal, the nation's second consecutive victory in the event. His countryman Ronald Levy took bronze. American Grant Holloway earned silver, placing the United States back on the podium in the event after the nation missed the medals for the first time in Rio 2016 (excluding the boycotted 1980 Games).

Summary

Coming in to the Olympics, Grant Holloway was the clear favorite. He was undefeated and tickled the world record with a 12.81 to win the US Trials, the #2 time in history. He was the only athlete under 13 seconds all year. His closest competitor on the yearly list was defending champion Omar McLeod from the heats of the Jamaican Olympic Trials. But McLeod failed to qualify for the Olympics from the strong field in those trials. McLeod tried to appeal to change the team makeup, but which deserving athlete would be left home to make room for him? His appeal failed. As expected, Holloway had the fastest times in the heats and the semis. 2012 bronze medalist Hansle Parchment was also in contention.

In the final, the script looked the same. Holloway was first out of the blocks, first over the first hurdle and had a clear lead over the closely matched wall of athletes behind him. By the fourth hurdle, Holloway had close to a metre lead, Ronald Levy then Andrew Pozzi emerged in second and third. Devon Allen and Hansle Parchment were close behind. Over the next three hurdles, Parchment made a big move to separate from the others, still a metre down on Holloway. Over the final three hurdles, Holloway lost his momentum. Parchment and the wall gained steadily. Holloway was still first over the last hurdle, but the thundering herd was approaching. Parchment went by with 10 metres to go. The next was Levy but Holloway executed a better lean at the finish, officially credited with .01 advantage over Levy to take silver. Two of the three people who beat McLeod at the Jamaican trials ended up on the podium.

Background
This was the 29th appearance of the event, which is one of 12 athletics events to have been held at every Summer Olympics.

Comoros and Hong Kong competed in the men's 110 metres hurdles for the first time. The United States made its 28th appearance, most of any nation (having missed only the boycotted 1980 Games).

Qualification

A National Olympic Committee (NOC) could enter up to 3 qualified athletes in the men's 110 metres hurdles event if all athletes meet the entry standard or qualify by ranking during the qualifying period. (The limit of 3 has been in place since the 1930 Olympic Congress.) The qualifying standard is 13.32 seconds. This standard was "set for the sole purpose of qualifying athletes with exceptional performances unable to qualify through the IAAF World Rankings pathway." The world rankings, based on the average of the best five results for the athlete over the qualifying period and weighted by the importance of the meet, will then be used to qualify athletes until the cap of 40 is reached.

The qualifying period was originally from 1 May 2019 to 29 June 2020. Due to the COVID-19 pandemic, the period was suspended from 6 April 2020 to 30 November 2020, with the end date extended to 29 June 2021. The world rankings period start date was also changed from 1 May 2019 to 30 June 2020; athletes who had met the qualifying standard during that time were still qualified, but those using world rankings would not be able to count performances during that time. The qualifying time standards could be obtained in various meets during the given period that have the approval of the IAAF. Only outdoor meets are eligible. The most recent Area Championships may be counted in the ranking, even if not during the qualifying period.

NOCs can also use their universality place—each NOC can enter one male athlete regardless of time if they had no male athletes meeting the entry standard for an athletics event—in the 110 metres hurdles.

Entry number: 40.

Competition format
The event continued to use the three-round format used previously in 1908–1956, 1964–1984, and since 2012.

Records
Prior to this competition, the existing world, Olympic, and area records were as follows.

Schedule
All times are Japan Standard Time (UTC+9)

The men's 110 metres hurdles took place over three consecutive days.

Results

Round 1
Qualification Rules: First 4 in each heat (Q) and the next 4 fastest (q) advance to the Semifinals.

Heat 1

Heat 2

Heat 3

Heat 4

Heat 5

Semifinals
Qualification Rules: First 2 in each heat (Q) and the next two fastest (q) advance to the final.

Semifinal 1

Semifinal 2

Semifinal 3

Final

References

Men's 110 metres hurdles
2020
Men's events at the 2020 Summer Olympics